Mario is an Austrian television series that aired on ARD in 1963. The series consisted of twelve episodes.

History
Mario goes with his dog Truxi (in later episodes Trux) in the Tyrolean Alps for a twelve-episode adventure. Mario goes into each episode skillfully skiing, paving the way for skiing to become popular for children in the 1960s. In the television series, the Austrian World Ski Champion Dagmar Rome and her son Mario Rome played the two lead roles. The series was directed by Otto Anton Eder and Hans Grimm. For the first six episodes of the series, Walter Riml oversaw the camera work. In later episodes Hannes Staudinger and Walter Partsch took over the camera work. The screenplay was written by Gunter Peis after his eponymous young people. Günter Peis was the producer and writer of the television series.

DVD release
The series was published in February 2010 as a double-sided DVD rated by the FSK for ages 6 years and up. The DVD has a total running time of 267 minutes in German (Dolby 2.0 mono) image format black and white.

Austrian television series
1963 Austrian television series debuts
1963 Austrian television series endings
1960s Austrian television series
German-language television shows